Edward Berton Almon (April 18, 1860 – June 22, 1933) was an American, and a Democratic member of the United States House of Representatives who represented northwest Alabama's 8th congressional district.

Early life 
Almon was born near Moulton, Alabama in Lawrence County, April 18, 1860, son of George W. and Nancy (Eubank) Almon. He graduated from the State Normal School in Florence, Alabama (the predecessor of the University of North Alabama) and then the University of Alabama School of Law in 1883. He passed the bar exam and entered the legal profession in 1885 in Tuscumbia, Alabama. He married Luie Clopper on December 13, 1887, and they had two daughters, Lottie and Louise.

Career
Almon entered the political arena in 1892 when he was elected to the Alabama Senate, and served from 1892 to 1894. He was a Presidential Elector for Alabama in 1896. Elected circuit court judge in 1898, he served until 1906. From 1910 to 1915 Almon served in the Alabama House of Representatives including one year (1911) as Speaker.  His successor, Archibald Hill Carmichael also served as Speaker of the Alabama House both immediately before and after Almon.

In 1914, Almon ran as a Democratic Party candidate for the United States House of Representatives and won. He took office on March 3, 1915 and served nine terms until his death on June 22, 1933.  During his term in the U.S. House he served as Chairman of the House Committee on Roads from 1931 until 1933.
On April 5, 1917, Almon was one of the 50 representatives who voted against declaring war on Germany, despite his district being one of the areas most heavily in favor of the war.  During the 65th Congress, both bodies passed the Sedition Act which criminalized certain kinds of political dissent in the United States. The 67th Congress repealed the act.

Death
Almon died in Washington, D.C., on June 22, 1933 (age 73 years, 65 days). He is interred at Oakwood Cemetery, Tuscumbia, Alabama.  He was succeeded by Archibald Hill Carmichael.

See also 
 65th United States Congress
 67th United States Congress
 List of United States Congress members who died in office (1900–49)

References

External links
 Alabama State Legislature Past Speakers and Clerks of the Alabama House of Representatives, Accessed 19 April 2007

1860 births
1933 deaths
University of North Alabama alumni
People from Moulton, Alabama
Democratic Party members of the Alabama House of Representatives
University of Alabama School of Law alumni
Democratic Party members of the United States House of Representatives from Alabama
Burials in Alabama
19th-century American politicians
20th-century American politicians